Holger Danske was a Danish resistance group during World War II. It was created by veteran volunteers from the Winter War who had fought on the Finnish side against the Soviet Union. It was among the largest Danish resistance groups and consisted of around 350 volunteers towards the end of the war. The group carried out about 100 sabotage operations and was responsible for around 200 killings of informers who had revealed the identity and/or the whereabouts of members of the resistance. The group was named after the legendary Danish hero Holger Danske.

History

The group was formed in Copenhagen in 1942 by five men who had all fought on the Finnish side during the Winter War. Resistance work carried a great deal of risk because the general public was still largely opposed to sabotage and the government was following its "co-operation" policy with the Nazis to keep German intervention in Danish affairs to a minimum. Holger Danske, as well as the rest of the Danish resistance, was very much opposed to this collaboration and continued to believe that the Danes should have resisted the invasion much more fiercely. Gunnar Dyrberg recalls in his memoir how he had seen Danes engage in friendly conversation with the Germans immediately after the invasion and cites this as one of the reasons he later decided to join Holger Danske, with the code name Bob Herman. A fuller account of his activities as a liquidator are described in his autobiographical book De ensomme Ulve (The Lonely Wolves). The group was infiltrated by the Gestapo twice but because of its loose structure (unlike BOPA) they were unable to identify all the members. A total of 64 members were executed by the Gestapo during the occupation. Among their largest sabotage actions were the blowing up of the Forum Copenhagen in 1943 and the attack on Burmeister & Wain in 1944.

Members 
Two of the members of Holger Danske were Jørgen Haagen Schmith and Bent Faurschou Hviid, who became famous under their aliases, Citronen (the Lemon) and Flammen (the Flame). Both led numerous sabotage operations in 1943 and 1944. They were portrayed in the 2008 movie Flammen og Citronen by Thure Lindhardt and Mads Mikkelsen. One member of the group, Lis Mellemgaard, survived the war as she remained at home with a sore throat when her colleagues were rounded up and executed in March 1945. The author Arne Sørensen was a member of the group. After the war, he was involved in the nation's reconstruction as a politician.

References

  Holger Danske Vaagner, Josef Petersen and "Bob" Jarset, Copenhagen, 1946
  Danmark under besættelsen og befrielsen 
  De illegale: To Holger Danske sabotører fortæller, Bob Herman, 1985, 
  En dreng alt vel fra Dannebrogsgade 60 til Nobel’s Explosive no. 808 - fra en Holger Danske sabotørs dagbog, Gunnar Dyrberg, 2006, 
  De ensomme Ulve, Gunnar Dyrberg, Gyldendal Copenhagen 2009, 208 pp, 
  Gemüse fortæller. Erindringer fortalt af Gemüse i mindet om Flammen og Citronen, Sofie-Amalie Høgsbro Østergaard, 

Danish resistance groups
Denmark in World War II
World War II resistance movements